José Fabián Ramírez (born 3 February 1977 in Esquina, Corrientes) is an Argentine football goalkeeper.

He played for most part of his career in Argentine teams such as San Lorenzo, Almagro, Quilmes and Olimpo. He also played in Greece for Ionikos F.C. and for Olimpia Asunción in the Paraguay first division.

External links
 
 José Fabián Ramírez – Argentine Primera statistics at Fútbol XXI  

1977 births
Living people
Sportspeople from Corrientes Province
Argentine footballers
San Lorenzo de Almagro footballers
Club Almagro players
Quilmes Atlético Club footballers
Olimpo footballers
Godoy Cruz Antonio Tomba footballers
Club Olimpia footballers
Ionikos F.C. players
Defensa y Justicia footballers
Argentine Primera División players
Super League Greece players
Argentine expatriate footballers
Expatriate footballers in Greece
Expatriate footballers in Paraguay
Association football goalkeepers
Argentina youth international footballers